The Portuguese Basketball Federation is the governing body for basketball in Portugal. Established on 17 August 1927, it became one of the eight founding national member federations of FIBA in 1932.

References

External links
Official Website

Basketball in Portugal
1927 establishments in Portugal
Sports organizations established in 1927
Basketball governing bodies in Europe